Gayathri Films was an Indian film production and distribution company headed by Chithra Ramu and Chitra Lakshmanan.

History 
Gayathri Films was one of the several production companies used by brothers Chitra Lakshmanan and Chithra Ramu as a part of their involvement in Tamil cinema. Notable films made as a part of the studio included Mann Vasanai (1983) and Soora Samhaaram (1988). Chithra Ramu died in 2017.

Filmography

References 

Film distributors of India
Film production companies based in Chennai
Indian film studios
1983 establishments in Tamil Nadu
Mass media companies established in 1983
Indian companies established in 1983